The Kota Kinabalu Convention City is a mixed development projects comprising residential, commercial, tourism centre and waterfront in Kota Kinabalu, Sabah, Malaysia. It is part of waterfront revitalisation projects under the Sabah Development Corridor (SDC) to transform Kota Kinabalu into a metropolitan city. The building projects covering an area of 9.33-acre site will be developed by Mah Sing Group. Other part of the waterfront is the Jesselton Quay, Kota Kinabalu City Waterfront and One Jesselton Waterfront, which developed by different developers.

References 

Buildings and structures in Kota Kinabalu